The Soldier's Tale is a 1959 Australian television ballet starring Robert Helpmann. It aired 4 March 1959 in Melbourne and 15 March 1959 in Sydney.

Helpman had performed the play on stage a number of times. He reconfigured it for television. Helpmann appeared with Edward Brayshaw; the two men knew each other from touring with Nude with Violin.

He later filmed it for British TV in 1964.

Cast
Heather MacCrae
Robert Helpmann
Edward Brayshaw

See also
List of live television plays broadcast on Australian Broadcasting Corporation (1950s)

References

External links

1950s Australian television plays
Australian television plays based on ballets
1959 television plays